The Mystic Catboat 20 is an American trailerable sailboat that was designed by Peter Legnos as a cruiser and first built in 1974.

Production
The design was built by the Legnos Boatbuilding Company in the United States between 1974 and 1987, but it is now out of production. The Legnos Boatbuilding Company still existed in 2021, renamed as LBI Corporation Inc, but is now predominantly engaged in defense contract work and no longer builds sailboats.

Design
The Mystic Catboat 20 is a recreational keelboat, built predominantly of fiberglass, with wood trim.

The boat's hull has a plumb stem; a raised counter, angled transom; a keel-mounted rudder controlled by a tiller and a fixed stub long keel, with a retractable centerboard. It displaces  and carries  of ballast.

The boat is fitted with a Japanese Yanmar 1GM diesel engine or other inboard gasoline engine, or, alternatively, a small  outboard motor for docking and maneuvering. When fitted, the optional fixed fuel tank holds .

The design has sleeping accommodation for two people, with a double "V"-berth in the bow cabin. The galley is located on the port side at the companionway ladder. The galley is equipped with a two-burner stove and a sink. The head is located opposite the galley on the starboard side.

Operational history
In a 2010 review Steve Henkel wrote, "unlike most of her comp[etitor]s, the Mystic Catboat 20 was designed to resemble a 19th century gentleman's cruising cat rather than a traditional working cat. To a large extent this sealed her fate as a catboat judged to be less seakindly—and therefore less popular—than the 'working' cat designs. She was offered with either gasoline or diesel inboard as options, and also was offered as a sloop ... which may have lessened some of her worst features under sail as  enumerated below. Best features: With her raked, wineglass transom, she is as a pretty as a picture. Worst features: She lacks many of the salutary features of a typical working cat, such as a big beam-to-length ratio, D/L of at least 200, outboard 'barn door' rudder hung on a vertical (not raked) transom, larger rudder and centerboard areas for better control, and big 'shoulders' aft to minimize broaching in heavy air and choppy seas."

See also
List of sailing boat types

References

External links
Photo of a Mystic Catboat 20 sailing
Photo of a Mystic Catboat 20 moored

Keelboats
1970s sailboat type designs
Sailing yachts
Trailer sailers
Sailboat type designs by Peter Legnos
Sailboat types built by Legnos Boatbuilding Company